Vriesea rubra is a plant species in the genus Vriesea. This species is native to Trinidad and northern South America (Colombia, Ecuador, Peru, Guyana, northern Brazil, and Venezuela).

References

rubra
Flora of Trinidad and Tobago
Flora of South America
Epiphytes
Plants described in 1802